Per Olof Sefastsson (born 14 March 1986) is a Swedish engineer and politician, serving as party treasurer of Alternative for Sweden since 28 November 2020.

Early life 

Per Olof Sefastsson was born on 14 March 1986 in Sollentuna, Stockholm, Sweden.

Political career

Sweden Democrats 

He was previously politically active with the Sweden Democrats in Danderyd Municipality.

Alternative for Sweden 

In June 2018, he visited the conference Development of Parliamentarism in Moscow together with Gustav Kasselstrand and Mikael Jansson.

He ran on 7th place in the 2018 Swedish general election.

He ran on 5th place in the 2019 European Parliament election in Sweden.

He was elected party treasurer at the party conference in November 2020.

In June 2022, it was announced that Sefastsson would run on 4th place in the 2022 Swedish general election and on 5th place in the 2022 Stockholm municipal election.

References 

1986 births
Living people
Conservatism in Sweden
Critics of Islamism
Critics of multiculturalism
21st-century Swedish politicians
Swedish politicians
Sweden Democrats politicians
Alternative for Sweden politicians
People from Sollentuna Municipality
People from Danderyd Municipality
Politicians from Stockholm
Swedish nationalists
Swedish engineers